The Henley Standard is a weekly newspaper based in Henley-on-Thames, Oxfordshire, England. It is published by Higgs Group and is one of only a few independently-owned local newspapers in the UK. It is also the only newspaper dedicated entirely to Henley and the surrounding villages.

The Standard covers Henley town and an area of south Oxfordshire as far as Watlington, Benson and Goring-on-Thames, as well as Caversham and Wargrave in Berkshire and the Hambleden valley in Buckinghamshire. The paper's circulation is about 10,000 copies a week and it claims a readership of about 35,000. Its current owner is John Luker and the editor is Simon Bradshaw, who joined in 2008 from the London Evening Standard.

The predecessor of the Henley Standard, first published in 1885, was The Henley Free Press. It became the Henley and South Oxfordshire Standard in 1892. Its name was shortened in 1956 to the Henley Standard.

The Henley and South Oxfordshire Standard was the first organ to publish works by the author George Orwell. These were poems that the author, under his real name Eric Blair, wrote aged 10 on the outbreak of the First World War in 1914 and also on the death of Lord Kitchener in 1916.

Awards 
In 2019, the Henley Standard was the named the UK's best smaller paid-for weekly of the year in the Society of Editors' Regional Press Awards. It was praised for having "maintained its tradition of solid, in-depth reporting with a variety of news, features, diary items, investigations and campaigns."

References

External links
 Henley Standard

1885 establishments in England
Henley-on-Thames
Newspapers published in Oxfordshire
Publications established in 1885
South Oxfordshire District